Sălcioara is a commune in Dâmbovița County, Muntenia, Romania with a population of 4,090 people. It is composed of nine villages: Bănești (the commune center), Cătunu, Cuza Vodă, Ghinești, Mircea Vodă, Moara Nouă, Movila, Podu Rizii and Sălcioara.

References

Communes in Dâmbovița County
Localities in Muntenia